The name National Iranian Television may represent:

 National Iranian Radio and Television, Iran's first radio/television network which operated from 1966 to 1979
Islamic Republic of Iran Broadcasting, the successor organization to the above after the 1979 Iranian Revolution